Metasiro is a genus of mite harvestmen in the family Neogoveidae. There are at least three described species in Metasiro.

Species
These three species belong to the genus Metasiro:
 Metasiro americanus (Davis, 1933)
 Metasiro sassafrasensis Clouse & Wheeler, 2014
 Metasiro savannahensis Clouse & Wheeler, 2014

References

Further reading

 

Harvestmen
Articles created by Qbugbot